"Not This Year" is a Christmas song written by Aly & AJ. It was featured as the closing track on the Christmas album, Acoustic Hearts of Winter. It is one of two songs for the album originally written by Aly & AJ, with the other being "Greatest Time of Year".

Song information
"Not This Year" is a mid-tempo song about not feeling jolly during the holiday season.

It's not snow, It's rain coming downAnd the lights are cool,But they burn outAnd I can't pull off the cheerNot this year''

Aly & AJ said in their lyric book that this song was dedicated to their grandmother Carmen who died on Christmas Eve.

This song is the alter ego of their single, "Greatest Time of Year". "Greatest Time of Year" is a happy, cheerful and Christmas song, while "Not This Year" is a sad, reflectful, and expresses what a "non-greatest" Christmas is like.

References

2006 songs
Aly & AJ songs
American Christmas songs
Songs written by Antonina Armato
Songs written by Tim James (musician)
Hollywood Records singles
Song recordings produced by Rock Mafia
Songs written by Aly Michalka
Songs written by AJ Michalka